Stanislav Heller (15 September 1924 – 23 January 2000) was a harpsichordist and musicologist of Czech origin. Born in Brno, he studied piano with Vilém Kurz and organ with Bedřich Wiederman at the Prague Conservatoire. His family emigrated to South America after World War II and Stanislav Heller moved then to London in 1947 and later became a British subject. He started a career as a concert harpsichordist there (one of the first concert harpsichordists in the 20th century) and also toured with Rafael Kubelík. In 1968 he moved to Freiburg as Professor of harpsichord and early chamber music at the Hochschule für Musik.

External links 
 

Czech harpsichordists
German harpsichordists
British harpsichordists
British people of Czech descent
Musicians from Brno
1924 births
2000 deaths
Academic staff of the Hochschule für Musik Freiburg
20th-century classical musicians
20th-century British musicians
20th-century German musicians
Czechoslovak emigrants to the United Kingdom
Naturalised citizens of the United Kingdom